Rita H. Roaldsen (born 4 July 1956 in Ballangen) is a Norwegian politician for the Centre Party.

She was elected to the Norwegian Parliament from Troms in 1993, but was not re-elected in 1997. Instead she served in the position of deputy representative during the term 1997–2001. Between 1997 and 1999, during the first cabinet Bondevik, she was appointed State Secretary in the Ministry of Social Affairs and Health.

Roaldsen was a member of Gratangen municipality from 1987 to 1993, returning in 1999 to serve as mayor for the next four years.

Outside politics she worked as a teacher.

References

1956 births
Living people
People from Ballangen
Centre Party (Norway) politicians
Members of the Storting
Mayors of places in Troms
Norwegian state secretaries
Women mayors of places in Norway
20th-century Norwegian women politicians
20th-century Norwegian politicians
Women members of the Storting
Norwegian women state secretaries